At Gunpoint is a 1955 American CinemaScope Western film directed by Alfred L. Werker and starring Fred MacMurray, Dorothy Malone and Walter Brennan.

Plot
In the Old West, brothers Alvin and Bob Dennis and their gang, plan to rob the bank in Plainview, believing it will be an easy job. During the ensuing robbery, the gang shoots a teller and kills the elderly marshal MacKay. Store owner Jack Wright grabs the marshal’s gun and wings Alvin Dennis. Another townsman, George Henderson, kills Alvin and the stolen money is recovered as the rest of the gang escapes. 

The town is appreciative of Jack's and George’s heroism, especially banker Livingstone. The Amarillo newspaper publishes photos of the Plainview heroes, which is seen by the Dennis gang. Bob Dennis vows revenge. The gang return to Plainview and kill George, who was just named the new town marshal. Jack realizes he could be next.

A federal marshal arrives to monitor the town, but leaves after an uneventful two weeks with no concerns. Jack and his family notice the town is shunning him and his business is declining.

A $2,500 reward for Alvin Dennis' capture is a pleasant surprise for Jack, but when Jack’s brother-in-law, Wally, is mistaken for Jack and murdered by Bob Dennis, no one is willing to help. In fact, he is offered more money by Livingstone and other frightened citizens if he will sell them the store and leave town. Doc Lacy and the Wrights are ashamed of everyone's lack of support in Jack's hour of need.

Jack arms himself to face Bob Dennis and his gang. He is outmatched; but, suddenly, the men in town come to Jack's aid, demanding the gang surrender. All but Bob give up and, as the outlaw approaches Jack, Doc Lacy manages to shoot him. The townspeople offer apologies to the Wrights, who are immediately willing to forgive and forget. Doc storms off, apparently not so willing.

Cast
 Fred MacMurray as Jack Wright
 Dorothy Malone as Martha
 Walter Brennan as Doc
 Skip Homeier as Bob Dennis
 Tommy Rettig as Billy
 John Qualen as Livingstone
 Whit Bissell as Clem Clark
 Jack Lambert as Kirk

See also
 List of American films of 1955

References

External links
 
 
 
 

1955 films
1955 Western (genre) films
Allied Artists films
American Western (genre) films
CinemaScope films
1950s English-language films
Films directed by Alfred L. Werker
Films scored by Carmen Dragon
1950s American films